Pheidole crassicornis is an ant, a species of higher myrmicine in the family Formicidae.

Subspecies
These two subspecies belong to the species Pheidole crassicornis:
 Pheidole crassicornis crassicornis Emery, 1895 i c g
 Pheidole crassicornis tetra Creighton, 1950 i c g
Data sources: i = ITIS, c = Catalogue of Life, g = GBIF, b = Bugguide.net

References

Further reading

External links

 

cerebrosior
Articles created by Qbugbot
Insects described in 1895